The Silence of the Marsh (also known as The Swamp's Silence) is a 2019 Spanish mystery thriller web film written and directed by Marc Vigil. The film stars Pedro Alonso, Àlex Monner and Carmina Barrios in the lead roles. The plot of the film is based on a novel written by Juanjo Braulio and the story revolves around a journalist turned crime novelist who also commits crime. The film originally premiered at the 2019 Seville European Film Festival. It was theatrically released in Spain on 1 January 2020. The Silence of the Marsh was made available for streaming on Netflix on 22 April 2020 and opened to mixed reviews from critics.

Cast 

 Pedro Alonso as Q
 Carmina Barrios as La Puri
 Àlex Monner as Fran
 Raúl Prieto as Nacho
 Nacho Fresneda as Falconetti
 José Ángel Egido as Carreterro
 Maite Sandoval
 Luis Zahera as Taxista
 Javier Godino as Vicent
 Zaira Romero as Sara

Production 
The principal photography of the film was held for a period of seven weeks and the portions of the film were mostly filmed across Valencia.

References

External links 
 

2019 films
2010s mystery thriller films
Spanish mystery thriller films
Films based on Spanish novels
Films shot in Valencia
Zeta Studios films
2010s Spanish films